Dil Bilmaz or Dilbilmaz may refer to:
 Dil Bilmaz, East Azerbaijan
 Dilbilmaz, West Azerbaijan